Anindita Raychaudhury is an Indian actress who works in Bengali-language TV shows and films. She is known for her role as Subhaga in the soap opera Potol Kumar Gaanwala, which is broadcast on Star Jalsha, a Bengali-language cable television channel in India. She has also appeared in the television serials Bhutu.

Personal life
On 26 January 2022, she married Sudip Sarkar.

TV shows

Filmography
 Bismillah

Webseries
 Nokol Heere

References

Living people
Bengali actresses
Indian soap opera actresses
Year of birth missing (living people)